Muroc Joint Unified School District is a public K-12 unified school system of approximately 2,000 students, located in the Mojave Desert approximately  northeast of Los Angeles.  It was founded as an elementary school in 1911 at Edwards. Boron students were bussed to the air base for their education.  As the area became more populated, another school was established in 1929, in Boron.  The schools became a unified district in 1953, encompassing  in Kern and San Bernardino counties.

The District serves the communities of Boron (including Kramer Junction and Desert Lake), North Edwards and Edwards Air Force Base, and maintains five school sites: Boron Junior/Senior High School (7-12); Desert Junior/Senior High School (7-12); West Boron Elementary School (TK-6); Branch Elementary School (TK-6); and Lynch Learning Center (Adult Education).  Both of the comprehensive high schools offer an alternative education program and have received "WASC Accreditation" .  All of these schools have been awarded "California Distinguished School" status.

Schools

Elementary
 Irving L Branch Elementary School
 West Boron Elementary School

Junior/Senior High School
 Boron Junior/Senior High School
 Desert Junior/Senior High School

Adult Education
Lynch Learning Center

See also
 List of school districts in California
 Southern Kern Unified School District
 List of school districts in Kern County, California
 Great Schools.org

External links 
 District Website

References 

School districts in Kern County, California
School districts established in 1953
1953 establishments in California